Thomas Broadley (18 August 1871 – 26 November 1950) was an English rugby union, and professional rugby league footballer who played in the 1890s. He played representative rugby union (RU) for England and Yorkshire (captain), and at club level for Bingley RFC, Bradford RFC and West Riding RFC, as a forward, e.g. front row, lock, or back row, and representative level rugby league (RL) for Yorkshire, and at club level for Leeds and Bradford F.C. (now Bradford Park Avenue A.F.C.) (captain), as a forward (prior to the specialist positions of), during the era of contested scrums. Prior to Tuesday 27 August 1895, Bradford F.C. was a rugby union club; it then became a rugby league club, and since 1907 it has been the association football (soccer) club Bradford Park Avenue.

Background
Thomas Broadley was born in Bingley, West Riding of Yorkshire, England, and he died aged 79 in Bradford, West Riding of Yorkshire, England.

Playing career

International honours
Tom Broadley won caps for England (RU) while at Bingley RFC in the 1893 Home Nations Championship against Wales, and Scotland, in the 1894 Home Nations Championship against Wales, Ireland, and Scotland, and in the 1896 Home Nations Championship against Scotland.

County honours
Tom Broadley represented Yorkshire (RU) while at Bingley RFC, and represented Yorkshire (RL) while at Leeds.

Championship final appearances
Tom Broadley played as a forward, i.e. number 8 in Bradford FC's 5–0 victory over Salford in the Championship tiebreaker during the 1903–04 season at Thrum Hall, Hanson Lane, Halifax on Thursday 28 April 1904, in front of a crowd of 12,000.

Challenge Cup Final appearances
Tom Broadley played as a forward, i.e. number 8, in Bradford F.C.'s 0–7 defeat by Batley in the 1898 Challenge Cup Final during the 1897–98 season at Headingley Rugby Stadium, Leeds on Saturday 23 April 1898, in front of a crowd of 27,941.

References

External links
[http://www.rlhp.co.uk/imagedetail.asp?id=1430 Image 

1871 births
1950 deaths
Bradford F.C. captains
Bradford F.C. players
Bradford RFC players
England international rugby union players
English rugby league players
English rugby union players
Footballers who switched code
Leeds Rhinos players
Rugby league forwards
Rugby league players from Bradford
Rugby union forwards
Rugby union players from Bingley
Yorkshire County RFU players
Yorkshire rugby league team players